Stalnye Lisy or  Steel Foxes, is a junior ice hockey team from Magnitogorsk, Chelyabinsk Oblast, Russia, which consists of players from the Metallurg Magnitogorsk academy. They are members of the Minor Hockey League, the top tier of junior hockey in the country.

Team and player honors
Kharlamov Cup
 Winners (1): 2009–10
 Runners-up (1): 2010–11
 3rd place (1): 2011–12

Viacheslav Fetisov Award
Sergei Tereshchenko: 2009–10

Vladislav Tretiak Award
Dmitri Voloshin: 2009–10

Vladimir Yurzinov Award
Evgeni Koreshkov: 2009–10

External links 
MHL profile

2009 establishments in Russia
Metallurg Magnitogorsk
Ice hockey clubs established in 2009
Ice hockey teams in Russia
Junior Hockey League (Russia) teams
Sport in Magnitogorsk